Live in Stockholm 1963 is a 1963 album by jazz musician John Coltrane.

Reception

In a review for AllMusic, Stephen Cook wrote: "As with most his live dates, Coltrane turns in extended explorations on all the selections, also leaving plenty of room for pianist Tyner to stretch out on more straightforward, but equally challenging solos. Drummer Jones matches the intensity of Coltrane's solo flights with propulsive and sensitive rhythmic support, while bassist Garrison anchors the proceedings with his steady and somewhat mercurial basslines... The blend of freedom, energy, and formality in his solos make live recordings from this time a good bet for newcomers to Coltrane's work."

Track listing
Original CD release   Live in Stockholm 1963 (Charly).
 "Traneing In" — 11:40
 "Mr. P.C." — 18:26
 "Naima" — 6:45
 "The Promise" — 6:55
 "Spiritual"— 11:21
 "I Want To Talk About You" — 9:09
 "Impressions" — 11:15

Personnel
Recorded October 22, 1963.

 John Coltrane — tenor saxophone/soprano saxophone
 McCoy Tyner — piano
 Jimmy Garrison — double bass
 Elvin Jones — drums

References

John Coltrane live albums
1963 live albums
Charly Records live albums